Godwin Izundu Nmezinwa Okpala is an Anglican bishop in Nigeria.

Okpala was Bishop of Nnewi and Archbishop of the Niger Province from 2018, retiring from both posts in 2019.

He was the first Bishop of Nnewi, appointed in 1996. He had previously been Archdeacon of Newi for Nnewi Diocese; he was elected at Sabongidda-Ora on 28 November 1995 for the Diocese of Nnewi, consecrated at the Cathedral Church of All Saints, Wuse, Abuja on 11 February 1996, and enthroned on 14 February 1996 at St Mary's Pro-Cathedral, Uruagu Nnewi.

References

 

Living people
Anglican bishops of Nnewi
Anglican archbishops of the Niger
21st-century Anglican archbishops
21st-century Anglican bishops in Nigeria
Year of birth missing (living people)
Church of Nigeria archdeacons